This is a list of law enforcement agencies in the state of Oklahoma.

According to the US Bureau of Justice Statistics' 2008 Census of State and Local Law Enforcement Agencies, the state had 483 law enforcement agencies employing 8,639 sworn police officers, about 237 for each 100,000 residents.

State agencies 

Attorney General of Oklahoma
Grand River Dam Authority Police Department
Oklahoma Alcoholic Beverage Laws Enforcement Commission
Oklahoma Bureau of Narcotics and Dangerous Drugs Control
Oklahoma Office of the Chief Medical Examiner
Oklahoma Council on Law Enforcement Education and Training
Oklahoma Criminal Justice Resource Center
Oklahoma Department of Corrections
Oklahoma Department of Emergency Management
Oklahoma Department of Environmental Quality
Criminal Investigation Unit
Oklahoma Department of Public Safety
Oklahoma Highway Patrol
Oklahoma Office of Homeland Security
Oklahoma Department of Tourism and Recreation
Oklahoma State Park Rangers

Oklahoma Department of Wildlife Conservation
Oklahoma District Attorneys Council
Oklahoma Department of Insurance
Anti-Fraud Unit
Oklahoma Office of Juvenile Affairs
Oklahoma Pardon and Parole Board
Oklahoma State Board of Pharmacy
Oklahoma State Bureau of Investigation
Oklahoma State Fire Marshal
Oklahoma Law Enforcement Retirement System
Oklahoma Police Pension and Retirement System
Oklahoma Department of Agriculture Investigative Services Unit
Oklahoma Department of Human Services Office of Inspector General

County sheriffs 

Adair County Sheriff's Office
Alfalfa County Sheriff's Office
Atoka County Sheriff's Office
Beaver County Sheriff's Office
Beckham County Sheriff's Office
Blaine County Sheriff's Office
Bryan County Sheriff's Office
Caddo County Sheriff's Office
Canadian County Sheriff's Office
Carter County Sheriff's Office
Cherokee County Sheriff's Office
Choctaw County Sheriff's Office
Cimarron County Sheriff's Office
Cleveland County Sheriff's Office
Coal County Sheriff's Office
Comanche County Sheriff's Office
Cotton County Sheriff's Office
Craig County Sheriff's Office
Creek County Sheriff's Office
Custer County Sheriff's Office
Delaware County Sheriff's Office
Dewey County Sheriff's Office
Ellis County Sheriff's Office
Garfield County Sheriff's Office
Garvin County Sheriff's Office
Grady County Sheriff's Office

Grant County Sheriff's Office
Greer County Sheriff's Office
Harmon County Sheriff's Office
Harper County Sheriff's Office
Haskell County Sheriff's Office
Hughes County Sheriff's Office
Jackson County Sheriff's Office
Jefferson County Sheriff's Office
Johnston County Sheriff's Office
Kay County Sheriff's Office
Kingfisher County Sheriff's Office
Kiowa County Sheriff's Office
Latimer County Sheriff's Office
Leflore County Sheriff's Office
Lincoln County Sheriff's Office
Logan County Sheriff's Office
Love County Sheriff's Office
Major County Sheriff's Office
Marshall County Sheriff's Office
Mayes County Sheriff's Office
McClain County Sheriff's Office
 McCurtain County Sheriff's Office
McInosh County Sheriff's Office
Murray County Sheriff's Office
Muskogee County Sheriff's Office
Noble County Sheriff's Office

Nowata County Sheriff's Office
Okfuskee County Sheriff's Office
Oklahoma County Sheriff's Office
Okmulgee County Sheriff's Office
Osage County Sheriff's Office
Ottawa County Sheriff's Office
Pawnee County Sheriff's Office
Payne County Sheriff's Office
Pittsburg County Sheriff's Office
Pontotoc County Sheriff's Office
Pottawatomie County Sheriff's Office
Pushmataha County Sheriff's Office
Roger Mills County Sheriff's Office
Rogers County Sheriff's Office
Seminole County Sheriff's Office
Sequoyah County Sheriff's Office
Stephens County Sheriff's Office
Texas County Sheriff's Office
Tillman County Sheriff's Office
Tulsa County Sheriff's Office
Wagoner County Sheriff's Office
Washington County Sheriff's Office
Washita County Sheriff's Office
Woods County Sheriff's Office
Woodward County Sheriff's Office

Municipal agencies 

Achille Police Department
Ada Police Department
Adair Police Department
Agra Police Department
Alex Police Department 
Allen Police Department
Altus Police Department
Alva Police Department
Anadarko Police Department
Antlers Police Department
Apache Police Department
Arapaho Police Department
Ardmore Police Department
Arkoma Police Department
Arnett Police Department
Atoka Police Department
 Avant Police Department 
Barnsdall Police Department
Bartlesville Police Department
Beaver Police Department
Beggs Police Department
Bennington Police Department
Bethany Police Department
Big Cabin Police Department
Billings Police Department
Binger Police Department
Bixby Police Department
Blackwell Police Department
Blair Police Department
Blanchard Police Department
Boise City Police Department
Bokchito Police Department
Bokoshe Police Department
Boley Police Department
Boynton Police Department
Bristow Police Department
Broken Arrow Police Department
Broken Bow Police Department
Buffalo Police Department
Burns Flat Police Department
Cache Police Department
Caddo Police Department
Calera Police Department
Canton Police Department
Carnegie Police Department
Carney Police Department
Cashion Police Department
Catoosa Police Department
Cement Police Department
Chandler Police Department
Chattanooga (Oklahoma) Police Department
Checotah Police Department
Chelsea Police Department
Cherokee Police Department
Chickasha Police Department
Choctaw Police Department
Chouteau Police Department
Claremore Police Department
Cleveland Police Department
Clinton Police Department
Coalgate Police Department
Colbert Police Department
Collinsville Police Department
Comanche Police Department
Commerce Police Department
Cordell Police Department
Coweta Police Department
Coyle Police Department
Crescent Police Department
Cromwell Police Department
Cushing Police Department
Cyril Police Department
Davenport Police Department
Davis Police Department
Del City Police Department
Depew Police Department
Dewar Police Department
Dewey Police Department
Dibble Police Department
Dickson Police Department
Drumright Police Department
Duke Police Department
Duncan Police Department
Durant Police Department
Edmond Police Department
El Reno Police Department
Eldorado Police Department
Elgin Police Department
Elk City Police Department
Elmore City Police Department
Enid Police Department
Erick Police Department
Eufaula Police Department
Fairfax Police Department
Fairland Police Department
Fairview Police Department
Fletcher Police Department
Forest Park Police Department
Forgan Police Department
Fort Cobb Police Department
Fort Gibson Police Department
Fort Sill Police Department
Frederick Police Department
Gage Police Department

Gans Police Department
Garber Police Department
Geary Police Department
Glenpool Police Department
Goodwell Police Department
Gracemont Police Department
Grandfield Police Department
Granite Police Department
Grove Police Department
Guthrie Police Department
Guymon Police Department
Haileyville Police Department
Harrah Police Department
Hartshorne Police Department
Haskell Police Department
Healdton Police Department
Heavener Police Department
Hennessey Police Department
Henryetta Police Department
Hinton Police Department
Hobart Police Department
Holdenville Police Department
Hollis Police Department
Hominy Police Department
Hooker Police Department
Howe Police Department
Hugo Police Department
Hydro Police Department
Idabel Police Department
Inola Police Department
Jay Police Department
Jenks Police Department
Jones Police Department
Kansas Police Department
Kaw City Police Department
Kellyville Police Department
Keota Police Department
Keyes Police Department
Kiefer Police Department
Kingfisher Police Department
Kingston Police Department
Kiowa Police Department
Konawa Police Department
Krebs Police Department
Lahoma Police Department
Langley Police Department
Langston Police Department
Laverne Police Department
Lawton Police Department
Lexington Police Department
Lindsay Police Department
Locust Grove Police Department
Lone Grove Police Department
Lone Wolf Police Department
Luther Police Department
Madill Police Department
Mangum Police Department
Mannford Police Department
Marietta Police Department
Marlow Police Department
Maud Police Department
Maysville Police Department
McAlester Police Department
McCurtain Police Department
McLoud Police Department
Medford Police Department
Medicine Park Police Department
Meeker Police Department
Miami Police Department
Midwest City Police Department
Minco Police Department
Moore Police Department
Mooreland Police Department
Morris Police Department
Mounds Police Department
Mountain View Police Department
Muldrow Police Department
Muskogee Police Department
Mustang Police Department
Newcastle Police Department
Newkirk Police Department
Nicoma Police Department
Ninnekah Police Department
Noble Police Department
Norman Police Department
North Enid Police Department
North Miami Police Department
Nowata Police Department
Oilton Police Department
Okarche Police Department
Okay Police Department
Okeene Police Department
Okemah Police Department
Oklahoma City Police Department
Okmulgee Police Department
Olustee Police Department
Oologah Police Department
Owasso Police Department

Panama Police Department
Pauls Valley Police Department
Pawhuska Police Department
Pawnee Police Department
Perkings Police Department
Perry Police Department
Piedmont Police Department
Pocola Police Department
Ponca City Police Department
Porter Police Department
Porum Police Department
Poteau Police Department
Prague Police Department
Pryor Police Department
Purcell Police Department
Quapaw Police Department
Quinton Police Department
Ramona Police Department
Ratliff City Police Department
Rattan Police Department
Ringling Police Department
Rock Island Police Department
Roff Police Department
Roland Police Department
Rush Springs Police Department
Ryan Police Department
Salina Police Department
Sallisaw Police Department
Sand Springs Police Department
Sapulpa Police department
Sawyer Police Department
Sayre Police Department
Seiling Police Department
Seminole Police Department
Sentinel Police Department
Shady Point Police Department
Shattuck Police Department
Shawnee Police Department
Skiatook Police Department
Snyder Police Department
South Coffeyville Police Department
Spavinaw Police Department
Spencer Police Department
Sperry Police Department
Spiro Police Department
Stigler Police Department
Stillwater Police Department
Stilwell Police Department
Stonewall Police Department
Stratford Police Department
Stringtown Police Department
Stroud Police Department
Sulphur Police Department
Tahlequah Police Department
Talala Police Department
Talahina Police Department
Tecumseh Police Department
Temple Police Department
Texhoma Police Department
Thackerville Police Department
The Village Police Department
Thomas Police Department
Tipton Police Department
Tishomingo Police Department
Tonkawa Police Department
Tryon Police Department
Tulsa Police Department
Tupelo Police Department
Tuttle Police Department
Tyrone Police Department
Valley Brook Police Department
Valliant Police Department
Vian Police Department
Vici Police Department
Vinita Police Department
Wagoner Police Department
Walters Police Department
Warner Police Department
Warr Acres Police Department
Watonga Police Department
Waukomis Police Department
Waurika Police Department
Wayne Police Department
Waynoka Police Department
Weatherford Police Department
Weleetka Police Department
West Siloam Springs Police Department
Westville Police Department
Wetumka Police Department
Wewoka Police Department
Wilburton Police Department
Wilson Police Department
Wister Police Department
Woodward Police Department
Wright City Police Department
Wyandotte Police Department
Wynnewood Police Department
Yale Police Department
Yukon Police Department

Public School Districts 
 Jenks Public Schools Police Department
 Lawton Public Schools Police Department
 Tulsa Public Schools Police Department 
 Putnam City Campus Police Department
 Noble Public Schools Police Department
 Muskogee Public Schools Police

College and University agencies 

Bacone College
Cameron University Police Department
Carl Albert State College Police Department
Central Technology Police Department
East Central University Police Department
Eastern Oklahoma State College Police Department
Langston University Police Department
Mid-America Christian University Police Department
Northeastern Oklahoma A&M Campus Police Department
Northern Oklahoma College Police Department
Northeastern State University Police Department
Northwestern Oklahoma State University Police Department
Southwestern Oklahoma State University Police Department
Southeastern Oklahoma State University Police Department

Oklahoma Baptist University Police Department
Oklahoma Christian University Police Department
Oklahoma City Community College Police Department
Oklahoma City University Police Department
Oklahoma Medical Research Foundation Police Department
Oklahoma State University Department of Public Safety
University of Oklahoma Department of Public Safety
Oral Roberts University Department of Public Safety
OU Health Science Center Police Department
Rogers State University Police Department
Seminole State College Police Department
St. Gregory's Junior College Police Department
Tulsa Community College Police Department
University of Central Oklahoma Department of Public Safety

Tribal agencies 

Absentee Shawnee Police Department
Caddo Nation Police Department
Cherokee Nation Marshal Service
Chickasaw Lighthorse Police Department
Choctaw Nation Law Enforcement
Citizen Potawatomi Nation Police Department
Comanche Nation Police Department
Eastern Shawnee Tribal Police Department
Iowa Tribal Police Department
Kaw Nation Police Department
Kickapoo Tribal Police Department
Miami Nation Tribe of Oklahoma Police Department

Muscogee (Creek) Lighthorse Police Department
Osage Nation Police Department
Otoe-Missouria Police Department
Pawnee Nation Police Department
Ponca Tribal Police Department
Prairie Band Potawatomi Police Department
Quapaw Tribal Marshal Service
Sac & Fox Nation Police Department
Santa Ana Tribal Police Department
Seminole Nation Light Horse Men
Tonkawa Tribal Police Department
Wyandotte Nation Police Department

See also 
 Police

References

 
Oklahoma
Law enforcement agencies